Vicky Genfan live is Vicki Genfan's second available release. The album was recorded during the Open Strings Festival on September 21, 2002, in Osnabrück, Germany. Genfan was until then nearly unknown in Germany; the recorded concert  introduced her to a fascinated audience.

Track listing
All songs by Vicki Genfan, except "What's Going On" by Marvin Gaye

 New Grass
 Impossinova
 What's Going On
 Outside the Box
 Why Don't Love Sit Still
 Si
 Offerings
 Don't Give Up On Me
 Kali Dreams
 Catch Me
 Carry Me Home

Personnel
Vicki Genfan - acoustic guitar
Peter Finger - producer
Michael Brammann - engineer
Tay Hoyle, Manfred Pollert - photography
Manfred Pollert - cover design

References

External links
Audio samples and review at CD Baby

Vicki Genfan albums
2003 live albums